Thomas Davis Gaelic Football Club is a Gaelic football club in Corrinshego in County Armagh, Northern Ireland. It is part of the Armagh GAA and plays in its Division 4 Football League and the Armagh Junior Football Championship. The club is named in honour of Thomas Davis, an Irish writer, poet and nationalist.

History
Corrinshego GFC can trace its history back to the beginning of the last century, and is one of the oldest clubs in the Newry area. In the early days, the senior football team was dominated by a few families. The Quinn family fielded six players, including Peter Quinn who represented Armagh in the 1930s as a senior football player. Camogie was also very strong in the club during this era. The club went out of existence in the 1951, a time of high emigration.

The present club was founded in 1982 by former members of Crossmaglen Rangers and St Patrick's Carrickcruppen GFC. In that same year Corrinshego defeated Clonmore by 2–9 to 1–6 to lift the county Junior Football Championship for the first time.

On Friday 26 July Corrinshego GFC won their first major piece of silverware since 1982 when they defeated Dromintee Seconds by 1–12 to 1–4 to be crowned Champions of Junior B.

Today the club has over 100 members and fields teams at Senior, Minor, Under 16, 14, 12 and 10 levels in the Armagh and South Armagh Football leagues. League and Championship titles have been won at underage levels.

Currently at under 17 in Thomas Davis Corrinshego the club is amalgamated  with Shane O'Neill's GAA of Camlough  and Redmund O’hanlons Poyntzpass

The amalgamated  team is known as  Patrick Rankin

The club is currently playing matches in the junior league in County Armagh (the lowest league)

People in charge
Anthony Havern
Karl Kimmins
David O’Brien
Gerry

Facilities
The club has now built a new playing pitch at the Doran's Hill Community Sports Campus in Newry. Completion was  expected in September 2013 and planning permission has been secured for a three-storey clubhouse and changing rooms. Future plans include a second pitch and associated works.

Notable players

 
 Karl Kimmins, Armagh minor, U21 and senior
 Gerald O'Reilly, Armagh minor, U21 and senior 
 Peter Quinn, Armagh player (1930s)

Honours
 Armagh Junior Football Championship (1)
 1982
 Green Cross Cup
 1995
 '''Armagh Junior 3B Football League:
 2013

References

Gaelic games clubs in County Armagh
Gaelic football clubs in County Armagh
1982 establishments in Northern Ireland